Achaguas is a small town in Apure State in Venezuela, in the Achaguas Municipality.

Achaguas may also refer to:

Achaguas Municipality, one of the seven municipalities (municipios) that makes up the Venezuelan state of Apure
Achaguas Province, a former Venezuelan province known as Apure Province from 1823 to 1864
Achagua people, an ethnic group of Colombia and Venezuela

See also
Achagua (disambiguation)